Giovanni Gazzinelli (6 September 1927, in Araçuaí – 14 January 2020) was a Brazilian medical doctor and scientist, with a PhD in biochemistry from the Universidade Federal de Minas Gerais, with a specialization in immunology.

Gazzinelli was Chief Scientific Investigator at Fiocruz. He received the grã-cruz ("Great Cross") of the Ordem Naciona l do Mérito Científico ("National Order of Scientific Merit") of Brazil.

References

1927 births
2020 deaths
Brazilian immunologists
Brazilian people of Italian descent
People from Minas Gerais
Recipients of the Great Cross of the National Order of Scientific Merit (Brazil)